Marie Curie Gargoyle is an outdoor 1989 sculpture by Wayne Chabre, installed on the University of Oregon campus in Eugene, Oregon, in the United States. The hammered copper sheet high-relief of Marie Curie measures approximately  x  x . It was surveyed by the Smithsonian Institution's "Save Outdoor Sculpture!" program in March 1993, though its condition was undetermined. The sculpture is administered by the University of Oregon.

See also

 1989 in art

References

1989 establishments in Oregon
1989 sculptures
Busts in Oregon
Copper sculptures in Oregon
Cultural depictions of Marie Curie
Monuments and memorials in Eugene, Oregon
Monuments and memorials to women
Outdoor sculptures in Eugene, Oregon
Sculptures by Wayne Chabre
Sculptures of women in Oregon
University of Oregon campus